Paradoxoglanis is a genus of electric catfishes native to Africa where all of the known species are endemic to the Democratic Republic of the Congo.  The species in this genus range from about 11–17 centimetres (4.3–6.7 in) SL.

Species
There are currently three recognized species in this genus:
Paradoxoglanis caudivittatus Norris, 2002
Paradoxoglanis cryptus Norris, 2002
Paradoxoglanis parvus Norris, 2002

References

Malapteruridae

 
Taxa named by Steven Mark Norris
Catfish genera
Freshwater fish genera
Strongly electric fish